Oregon Health & Science University Hospital (OHSU Hospital) is a 576-bed teaching hospital, biomedical research facility, and Level I trauma center located on the campus of Oregon Health & Science University (OHSU) in Portland in the U.S. state of Oregon. OHSU hospital has consistently been ranked by the U.S. News & World Report as the #1 hospital in the Portland metro regional area and is frequently ranked nationally in multiple medical specialties.

Located on OHSU's Marquam Hill campus south of Downtown Portland, the hospital is adjacent to Doernbecher Children's Hospital and a Shriners Hospital for Children. OHSU Hospital is one of only two Level I trauma centers in Oregon.

History

In 1887, a state medical school was chartered by the University of Oregon that would later become OHSU. During the 20th century, various academic institutions began offering nursing, dental, and public health education for the first time in Portland. Meanwhile, institutions emerged to offer medical services to disabled children and the indigent. These institutions and academic programs would later merge to form OHSU.

In 1974, these hospitals, schools, and academic programs were brought together to form the new University of Oregon Health Sciences Center, and became the state of Oregon's only academic medical center. It was renamed Oregon Health Sciences University in 1981. 1981 was also the year that OHSU was designated a Level 1 trauma center: one of only two in the state of Oregon.

In 1995, OHSU became a public corporation separate from the Oregon State System of Higher Education. Dispensing with the Board of Higher Education as the governing body of the institution, OHSU adopted a board of directors. The governor nominates members of the OHSU Board of Directors; they are then approved by the Oregon Senate.

Rankings
In 2015–2016, OHSU hospital was ranked #19 nationally for its ear, nose, and throat specialties, #36 for its geriatric medicine specialty, and #37 nationally for its cancer specialty.

Accreditation
Oregon Health & Science University Hospital is accredited by Det Norske Veritas (DNV) .

See also
 Legacy Emanuel Medical Center
 Oregon Health & Science University Emergency Heliport
 OHSU Health Hillsboro Medical Center
 Providence Portland Medical Center
 Providence St. Vincent Medical Center

References

Hospitals in Portland, Oregon
Oregon Health & Science University
Teaching hospitals in Oregon
Homestead, Portland, Oregon
Trauma centers